Frank Whitehouse (June 1876 – before 1960) was an English footballer who played in the Football League for Burslem Port Vale, Glossop and Stoke.

Career
Whitehouse played for Bucknall, before joining Burslem Port Vale in June 1899. He bagged a brace on his (known) debut, playing outside-right in a 5–0 win over West Bromwich Albion at the Athletic Ground on 11 December 1899, in a first round Birmingham Senior Cup match. He played 19 Second Division matches for Vale, scoring once in a 2–1 defeat to Small Heath at Muntz Street.

He signed for Stoke in May 1900 and spent his first two seasons at the Victoria Ground in the reserves before becoming a regular in the 1902–03 season, where he scored nine goals. He scored the same amount in the 1903–04 campaign, and hit a hat-trick in a 3–2 Boxing day win over Bolton Wanderers at Burnden Park. However, he lost his place in the side to Ross Fielding midway through the 1904–05 season. He left the Victoria Ground in the summer of 1905 and joined Second Division Glossop, where he played 20 times, scoring four goals.

Career statistics
Source:

References

Sportspeople from Newcastle-under-Lyme
English footballers
Association football forwards
Port Vale F.C. players
Stoke City F.C. players
Glossop North End A.F.C. players
English Football League players
1876 births
Year of death missing